Bitfinex is a cryptocurrency exchange owned and operated by iFinex Inc registered in the British Virgin Islands. Their customers' money has been stolen or lost in several incidents, and they have been unable to secure normal banking relationships.

Research suggests that price manipulation of bitcoin on Bitfinex accounted for about half of  bitcoin's price increase in late 2017.

History

2012: Early history 
Bitfinex was founded in December 2012 as a peer-to-peer Bitcoin exchange offering digital asset trading services to users worldwide. Bitfinex initially started as a P2P margin lending platform for Bitcoin and later added support for more cryptocurrencies.

2015-2016: New partnership and security breach 
In 2015, Bitfinex partnered with Palo Alto company BitGo to offer highly-secured "wallets" that allow people to store their digital currencies online. BitGo has insurance against Bitcoin theft.

In May 2015, the exchange was hacked, which resulted in the loss of 1,500 Bitcoins or about $400,000 USD of their customers' assets. In October 2018, Bitfinex again had serious difficulties with its banking relationships. Its management stated, "Bitfinex is not insolvent on October 7."

In June 2016, the U.S. Commodity Futures Trading Commission ordered Bitfinex to pay a $75,000 fine for offering illegal off-exchanged financed commodity transactions. The order also found that Bitfinex violated the Commodity Exchange Act by not registering as a Futures Commission Merchant.

2017-2018: Banking changes 
In April 2017,  Bitfinex announced it was experiencing delays in processing USD withdrawals after Wells Fargo cut off its wire transfers. Shortly after the Wells Fargo cutoff, Bitfinex stated all international wires had been cut off by its Taiwanese bank. Since then, Bitfinex has moved between a series of banks in other countries without disclosing to customers where the money is kept.

Noble Bank International of San Juan, Puerto Rico reportedly handled some dollar banking for the exchange in 2017 or 2018. The banking relationship was reportedly terminated in September 2018 as Noble Bank encountered financial difficulties.

In March 2018, British Virgin Islands-based Bitfinex confirmed the exchange’s plans to relocate its primary server infrastructure to Zug, Switzerland.

In May 2018, Bitfinex emailed some of its users asking for some tax details, which the company indicated it would share with the government of the British Virgin Islands, which might, in turn, pass it on to the governments of the users' countries of residence.

Phil Potter, Chief Strategy Officer of Bitfinex, left the exchange on June 22, 2018.

2019: Launch of Tether 
In April 2019, New York Attorney General Letitia James launched an investigation accusing Bitfinex of using the reserves of Tether, an affiliated company, to cover up a loss of $850 million to a Panamanian payment processor known as Crypto Capital Corp.  Reggie Fowler, who is alleged to have connections with Crypto Capital, was indicted on April 30, 2019, for running an unlicensed money-transmitting business for cryptocurrency traders.  He is believed to have failed to return about $850 million to an unnamed client. Investigators also seized $14,000 in counterfeit currency from his office. Bitfinex had been unable to obtain a normal banking relationship, according to the lawsuit, so it deposited over $1 billion with a Panamanian payment processor known as Crypto Capital Corp. No contract was ever signed with Crypto Capital. James alleged that in 2018 Bitfinex knew or suspected that Crypto Capital had absconded with the money, but that their investors were never informed of the loss.

Bitfinex's reported figures for 2017 were $333.5 million in gross profits, $6.8 million in expenses, $326 million in net profit, and $246 million in dividends.

2020-2023: Acquisitions and investments 
On October 15, 2021, it was announced that Bitfinex would pay a $1.5 million fine to the Commodity Futures Trading Commission for illegal, off-exchange retail commodity transactions in digital assets with Americans.

Bitfinex launched a new payment technology that would allow online merchants to receive contactless and borderless cryptocurrency payments in 2021, called Bitfinex Pay.

Bitfinex, Kraken, and KuCoin began exploring ways to enter the Indian cryptocurrency market in 2021.

In September 2022, Bitfinex, alongside several other leading exchanges, temporarily paused all deposits and withdrawals of Ethereum-based tokens during the Ethereum software upgrade known as the Merge.

As of January 2023, Bitfinex plans to open an office in El Salvador. El Salvador plans to issue its "volcano" token this year, which will be issued using blockchain technology, and which will trade on Bitfinex’s exchange.

2016 hack 

In August 2016, Bitfinex announced it had suffered a major security breach. Immediately thereafter, Bitcoin's trading price plunged by 20%. After learning of the breach, Bitfinex halted all Bitcoin withdrawals and trading. In that hack, the second-biggest breach of a Bitcoin exchange platform, 119,756 units of Bitcoin, worth about $72 million at the time, were stolen. The Bitcoin was taken from users' segregated wallets and Bitfinex said it was tracking down the hack. Exchange customers, even those whose accounts were not broken into, had their account balance reduced by 36% and received BFX tokens in proportion to their losses. All users who kept their BFX tokens were reimbursed in full within eight months of the hack, in April 2017. The exchange's access to U.S. dollar payments and withdrawals was then curtailed. The hack happened even though Bitfinex was securing the funds with BitGo, which uses multiple-signature security.

The United States Department of Justice recovered the stolen Bitcoin, and a New York couple, Ilya Lichtenstein and his wife, Heather Morgan, was federally charged in February 2022 with conspiring to launder the Bitcoin, which was then worth $3.6 billion. According to Justice officials, Lichtenstein and Morgan are charged with conspiracy to launder money, which has a maximum sentence of 20 years in prison, and conspiracy to defraud the United States, which carries a maximum sentence of five years in prison. On 10 February 2022, it was reported that Heather Morgan was detained in Manhattan last 8 February 2022 with her husband, Ilya Lichtenstein.

Referring to the 2016 hack, IRS Commissioner Charles Rettig said, "This was also the largest single financial seizure recorded by the federal government."

Tether 

Tether is a cryptocurrency (a so-called stablecoin) which Tether Limited had claimed to be pegged to the US dollar. Tether is closely associated with Bitfinex, with whom, as of 2018, they shared common shareholders and management. In 2017, critics raised questions about the relationship between Bitfinex and Tether.

In February 2021, Bitfinex agreed to pay $18.5 million in a settlement with the New York Attorney General's office regarding allegations over Bitfinex parent iFinex making false statements about the backing of Tether and the movement of hundreds of millions of dollars between the two companies to cover up  massive losses by Bitfinex in 2017 and 2018.  As part of the agreement, Bitfinex will maintain its prohibition on trading activity with New Yorkers. 

In 2021, Bitfinex repaid their remaining loan balance to Tether in full.

See also 
 Bitcoin
 Cryptocurrency exchange
 Coinbase
 Kraken
 Mt. Gox

References

External links 
 

Bitcoin exchanges
Cryptocurrencies
Bitcoin companies
Cryptocurrency theft